A justacorps or justaucorps is a knee-length coat worn by men in the latter half of the 17th century and throughout the 18th century. The garment is of French origin, and was introduced in England as a component of a three-piece ensemble, which also included breeches and a long vest or waistcoat. This ensemble served as the prototype of the frock coat, which in turn evolved into the modern-day three-piece suit.

The fabric selection and styling of the justacorps varied throughout time periods, as fashions frequently altered.

Development
In 1666, Charles II of England reset men's fashion in England by introducing a new garment, referred to as a vest or  waistcoat. The vest was knee-length, worn in conjunction with breeches and an overcoat of equal length. The coat became known as the justacorps or cassock due to its similarity to the vestments worn by priests. This outfit is thought to be the prototype of the modern day men's three-piece suit. This outfit seems to have been a plainer "sober" take on the earlier but similarly cut justaucorps, veste and culottes outfit which had been imposed by King Louis XIV in the French court. King Charles gradually became more closely influenced by French fashions by the 1670s, and French fashion spread to the English public.

The justaucorps, according to Susan Mokhberi, was modelled on a similar Persian coat, with similar floral embroidery and tight fitting body and sleeves. Like the Persian rulers did with the garment, King Louis XIV bestowed it onto key subjects as an emblem of his favour, and it came to be associated with French absolutism and the links and commonalities between the Safavid and Bourbon absolutist regimes.

Similar coats known as achkans and sherwanis had been worn in India for centuries, and could be either sleeved or sleeveless. These were often worn by wealthy travellers who visited the East during the early 1600s, and some may have been brought back to England. Another garment that came into fashion in Poland and Hungary at the same time was the zupan or dolman with its distinctive turn-back cuffs and decorative gold braid. The zupan started out as a long and heavy winter gown before becoming shorter and more fitted during the 16th century. These Polish garments (kontusz and zupan) were also based on oriental influences, due to the Polish cultural ideology of Sarmatism. These Central European and Indian long coats probably influenced the design of the justacorps later favored by Louis XIV of France and King Charles due to their exotic appearance, comfort and practicality.

In Scotland there are two similar garments: the "jeistiecor" (a jacket; a waistcoat with sleeves) and the "justicoat" "justiecor" (a sleeved waistcoat)

17th century

Despite the outfit introduced by Charles II in 1666, the justacorps did not establish itself as a popular component of men's dress until around 1680. It replaced the doublet, a previously popular shorter style of coat. The justacorps was worn to the knee, covering an equal length vest and breeches underneath. It opened center front, typically having many buttons and buttonholes lining the entire length of the opening. The sleeves were fitted, and featured deep cuffs. Some styles of the justacorps remained fitted throughout the bodice, though other versions feature a more accentuated, flared skirt through the addition of gores and pleats. Justacorps also featured decorative pockets, often placed too low for the wearer to take functional advantage. Worn primarily by aristocratic, wealthy men, justacorps were very ornate in design and made of luxurious fabrics. Colourful silk, satin, brocade, damask, and wool were commonly used textiles. Justacorps often were accented with contrasting fabrics of different colours and patterns, displayed through turned back cuffs or a decorative sash worn across the shoulders. By the early 18th century, the silhouette of the justacorps had become wider, with a fuller skirt, and laid the foundation for men's fashion throughout the rest of the century.

18th century
In the first half of the 18th century, the justacorps altered in appearance. The garment's opening remained at center front, however the buttons only extended to the waist area, allowing extra room for the extension of a fuller skirt. The cuffs became tighter and no longer folded back, and pockets were functional, located at a more accessible, hip-level region. The opening of the justacorps was rounded towards the mid chest, and flared away from the body.

In the second half of the 18th century, the justacorps skirt decreased in fullness, becoming narrower. A straight edge, similar to 17th-century-style openings, replaced the rounded opening of the coat, and sleeves reverted to a deep, turned back cuff.
Textiles for the justacorps varied by use. Durable fabrics, like wool, were used in ordinary, everyday situations, and typically had less ornamentation compared to ones worn in elegant, formal settings. These coats were made of ornate fabrics like silk and brocade, and decorated with elaborate embroidery and lace.

The justacorps should be distinguished as different from the frock coat, which was less ornate, differed in cut and silhouette, and not worn popularly until the late 18th century.

See also
1650–1700 in fashion
1700–1750 in fashion

References

Citations

Sources
Condra, Jillian: The Greenwood Encyclopedia of Clothing Throughout World History: 1501 - 1800, Greenwood Publishing Group, 2008, 
Payne, Blanche: History of Costume from the Ancient Egyptians to the Twentieth Century, Harper & Row, 1965.  
Picken, Mary Brooks: The Fashion Dictionary, Funk and Wagnalls, 1957.  (1973 edition )
Ribeiro, Aileen: Fashion and Fiction: Dress in Art and Literature in Stuart England, Yale University Press, 2005, 
Tortora, Phyllis G. & Eubank, Keith: Survey of Historic Costume; 5th edition, Fairchild Books, 2010,

External links
 
 

17th-century fashion
18th-century fashion
Coats (clothing)